Michael Pollard (born 2 November 1989) is a New Zealand first-class cricketer who plays for Wellington.

References

External links
 

1989 births
Living people
New Zealand cricketers
Canterbury cricketers
Wellington cricketers
Cricketers from Wellington City